Gav Bandeh (also Romanized as Gāv Bandeh; also known as Gāvāneh, Gāvbandel, and Gāwāna) is a village in Miyan Darband Rural District, in the Central District of Kermanshah County, Kermanshah Province, Iran. At the 2006 census, its population was 2,242, in 547 families.

References 

Populated places in Kermanshah County